This is a list of cities, municipalities, and towns in Tanzania.

List

See also
 Urban planning in Africa: Tanzania
 List of cities in East Africa

Notes

References

External links

 
Tanzania, List of cities in
Cities
Tanzania